The 1999–2000 Liga Bet season saw 153 clubs competing in 11 regional divisions for promotion to Liga Bet.

Beitar Safed, Hapoel Maghar, Hapoel Bnei Manda, Hapoel Yafa, Maccabi Tzur Shalom, Hapoel Baqa al-Gharbiyye, Shimshon Bnei Tayibe, Maccabi Yehud, Beitar Holon, Hapoel Sde Uzziah/Be'er Tuvia and Hapoel Rahat won their regional divisions and promoted to Liga Bet.

Second placed clubs, Hapoel Ramot Menashe Megiddo, Hapoel Aliyah Kfar Saba, Maccabi Holon, Beitar Kiryat Gat and Moadon Tzeirei Rahat were also promoted, after several vacancies were created in Liga Bet.

Upper Galilee Division

Western Galilee Division

Bay Division

Jezreel Division

Haifa Division

Beitar Kiryat Yam withdrew.

Samaria Division

Maccabi Musmus withdrew.

Sharon Division

Hapoel Jisr az-Zarqa, Maccabi Amidar Netanya and Maccabi Kfar Yona withdrew.

Dan Division

Hapoel Neve Golan withdrew.

Tel Aviv Division

Beitar Bat Yam and Maccabi Dynamo Holon withdrew.

Central Division

Beitar Beit Shemesh and Hapoel Gedera withdrew.

South Division

Hapoel Bnei Laqiya withdrew.

See also
1999–2000 Israeli Premier League
1999–2000 Liga Leumit
1999–2000 Liga Artzit
1999–2000 Liga Alef
1999–2000 Liga Bet
1999–2000 Israel State Cup

References
Israel Sixth Level 1999/2000 RSSSF

6
Liga Gimel seasons